The 2007–08 Men's EuroFloorball Cup Qualifying rounds took place over 29 August – 9 September 2007 in three different host nations. The winner of each group advanced to the 2007–08 Men's EuroFloorball Cup Finals, where they had a chance to win the EuroFloorball Cup for 2007–08. A total of 15 teams played in the qualifying round, all from different countries.

The 2007–08 EuroFloorball Cup marked the first year in which the new name for the tournament was used (previously known as the European Cup). The tournament also marked its 15th year, which was a huge achievement for the International Floorball Federation.

Qualification format 
Since the top four nations at the 2006–07 Men's EuroFloorball Cup were from Sweden, Finland, Switzerland, and the Czech Republic, the top team in that country automatically advances straight into the final round. In addition to that, the reigning champions receive automatic qualification into the final round as well. 5 teams in total receive automatic qualification.

Since 5 of the 8 spots are filled, the other three need to be decided using regional qualification. In Group C, the runners-up to the top team in Sweden, Finland, Switzerland, and the Czech Republic play for a spot in the finals. In the 2007–08 EuroFloorball Cup, both the top team in Sweden and the runners-up automatically qualified for the tournament, and therefore Group C consisted of 3 teams instead of 4. In Groups A and B, the teams are split into regions: West Europe and East Europe, respectively. The winning team in each group advances to the finals, making the total number of teams eight.

To be eligible to take part in the 2007–08 Men's EuroFloorball Cup, teams that take place in regional qualification must capture the national title in floorball in their country. If that team does not register, then the 2nd place team can register, and so forth.

Qualifying Venues 
Group A qualifications for Western Europe took place in Bærum, Norway from 29 August – 2 September 2007.
Group B qualifications for Eastern Europe took place in Ciampino, Italy from 5 to 9 September 2007.
Group C qualifications took place in Liberec, Czech Republic from 7 to 9 September 2007.

Bærum, Norway

Group A

Conference A

Conference B

Playoffs

Semi-finals

Bronze-medal match

Championship match

Placement matches

5th-place match

Ciampino, Italy

Group B

Liberec, Czech Republic

Group C

See also 
 2007–08 Men's EuroFloorball Cup Finals

External links 
 2007–08 Men's EuroFloorball Cup Finals – Official Website
 2007–08 Men's EuroFloorball Cup Finals – Standings & Statistics
 2007–08 Men's EuroFloorball Cup Qualifying Norway – Official Site
 2007–08 Men's EuroFloorball Cup Qualifying Norway – Standings & Statistics
 2007–08 Men's EuroFloorball Cup Qualifying Italy – Official Site
 2007–08 Men's EuroFloorball Cup Qualifying Italy – Standings & Statistics
 2007–08 Men's EuroFloorball Cup Qualifying Czech Republic – Standings & Statistics

EuroFloorball Cup
Mens Eurofloorball Cup Qualifying, 2007-08